Aisha Dee (born 13 September 1993) is an Australian actress and singer. She is best known for her main roles as Desi Biggins on the children's television series The Saddle Club (2008–09) and Kat Edison on the Freeform comedy-drama television series The Bold Type (2017–21).

Early life 
Dee was born on 13 September 1993 on the Gold Coast, Queensland, Australia. She is biracial: born to a white Australian mother and African American father.

Career 
In 2008, Dee had her first major television role as Desi Biggins on the Australian-Canadian children's series The Saddle Club. In 2010, Dee was a reoccurring character in the Australian-British show Dead Gorgeous as Christine. From 2011 to 2013, she starred as Mackenzie Miller in the Fox sitcom I Hate My Teenage Daughter. She also co-starred as Elizabeth "Beth" Kingston on the ABC Family drama series Chasing Life, from 2014 to 2015. 

Dee starred as Jules Koja in the Syfy horror anthology series Channel Zero: No-End House, which aired in 2017. On 22 August 2016, it was announced that Dee was cast as Kat Edison in the Freeform comedy-drama series The Bold Type, which premiered on 20 June 2017. On 4 October 2017, Freeform renewed the series for two additional seasons of 10 episodes each. The second season premiered on 12 June 2018 and ended on 7 August 2018.

Filmography

Film

Television

Awards and nominations

Discography

The Saddle Club discography
Albums
 Best Friends (2009)
 Grand Gallop – Meilleures Amies (2009) – Released in France only

Singles
 "These Girls" (2009)

Dee Dee & the Beagles
Albums
 Dee Dee & the Beagles EP (2015)

Aisha Dee
Albums
 Ice in My Rosé EP (2020)

References

External links
 
 Dee Dee & the Beagles

1993 births
Living people
Australian child actresses
Australian film actresses
Australian television actresses
Australian people of African-American descent